Yitzchak Blazer (Hebrew: יצחק בלאזר) ‎(1837–1907) was an early important leader of the Musar movement.

He is also sometimes referred to as Rav Itzele Peterburger due to his position as Chief Rabbi of St. Petersburg at a time when it was the capital of Russia.

Background
Rav Yitzchak Blazer was a student of Rabbi Yisroel Salanter, founder of the Musar movement, under whose direction, despite his relatively young age (25) he was appointed Chief Rabbi of St. Petersburg.

Accomplishments
Among Blazer's accomplishments, in addition to his own authorship of Pri Yitzchak,  a halakhic responsa text, was the publishing of many of Salanter's letters in Or Yisrael ("The Light of Israel"), as well as articles on Musar, Teshuvah, and the life of his teacher, Rav Yisrael Salanter.  He also authored Kochvei Ohr.

From 1880 to approximately 1891, he served as the head of the Kovno Kollel in Kaunas, Lithuania, which was founded by Salanter.  Under Blazer's direction, the kollel came to be "considered by its contemporaries as a bastion of the Mussar movement," a Jewish ethical movement based in Lithuania within the Russian Empire, and was attacked by the Musar movement's opponents.  

He later joined Nosson Tzvi Finkel in leading the Slabodka Yeshiva.

Rabbi Yosef Yozel Horwitz was one of the primary pupils of Rabbi Blazer.

Later years
In 1904 he emigrated to Jerusalem, where Rav Shmuel Salant was Chief Rabbi; during Rav Itzele's last three years they worked together on several communal and charitable projects. Rav Blazer died on 11 Av 5667 (1907).

Personal Anivus
In keeping with his teacher's ideas and ideals, his acts of personal Anivus (humility) included:
 worked as a painter until stopped by Rav Salanter.
 worked as a clerk during his last three years of life, rather than take communal funds.
 wrote that he was not to be given a formal eulogy.

References

External links
 R' Aaron Rakeffet-Rothkoff on Yitzchak Blazer

1907 deaths
19th-century rabbis from the Russian Empire
Musar movement
1837 births
Rabbis from Kaunas